The 1965 IFA Shield Final was the 64th final of the IFA Shield, the second oldest football competition in India, and was contested between Kolkata giants East Bengal and Mohun Bagan on 22 September 1965 first which ended in a draw and then a replay on 16 October 1965 at the Mohun Bagan Ground in Kolkata.

East Bengal won the replayed final 1–0 to claim their 8th IFA Shield title. Ashim Moulik scored the only goal in the replay final as East Bengal lifted their eighth IFA Shield title.

Route to the final

Match

Summary
The IFA Shield final began at the Mohun Bagan Ground in Kolkata on 22 September 1961 in front of a packed crowd as Kolkata giants East Bengal and Mohun Bagan faced each other in a Kolkata Derby. Mohun Bagan made their seventeenth appearance in the final after they defeated Bangalore XI 5–0 in the semi-final, having won it nine times previously in 1911, 1947, 1948, 1952, 1954, 1956, 1960, 1961, and 1962. East Bengal reached their thirteenth final after defeating Bengal Nagpur Railway 2–0 in the semi-final, having won the title seven times previously in 1943, 1945, 1949, 1950, 1951, 1958, and 1961. 

Both Mohun Bagan and East Bengal tried to dominate the game from the first minute but cancelled each other out. The goalkeepers Pradyut Barman and Peter Thangaraj were the stars of the game as both of them made some terrific saves as the game ended in a goalless draw. The committee decided to host the final in a later date.

Details

Replay

Summary
The replay final began at the Mohun Bagan Ground in Kolkata on 16 October 1965 after the first game ended in a 0–0 stalemate.

East Bengal and Mohun Bagan both tried to dominate the game once again from the first minute with both the teams creating multiple chances but failed to break the deadlock. Kajal Mukherjee got the best chance for Mohun Bagan in the first half but he missed an open net as the game remained goalless at halftime. The match slowed down in the second half and was almost going to end in another goalless tie, when Ashim Moulik received the ball from Parimal Dey in the very last minute of the game and scored with a powerful long range effort to make it 1–0 for East Bengal as they lifted their eighth IFA Shield title.

Details

References

External links
IFA Shield Finals

IFA Shield finals
1965–66 in Indian football
East Bengal Club matches
Mohun Bagan AC matches
Football competitions in Kolkata